Lamokowang is a 2003 documentary film from the Democratic Republic of the Congo.

Synopsis 
The calabash is used as a metaphor for Africa and its representation of cinema. The rhythm intrudes into the film to pose questions of yesterday's cinema and emphatically address tomorrow's. Will cinema be able to break free from clichés and prejudices?

Production
It is one of three short films along with True Story and Intervention Rapide made by Katondolo in conjunction with Yole!Africa, a community arts organization based in Goma.

Awards 
 Zanzíbar 2004

References 

2003 films
Creative Commons-licensed documentary films
Democratic Republic of the Congo short documentary films
2003 short documentary films
Documentary films about African cinema
2000s French-language films